The Mansfield Giants are a basketball club from Mansfield, Nottinghamshire, England.  The club was originally formed in 1990, and home games are played at the Oak Tree Leisure Centre.

The Giants debuted in the English Basketball League in the 2006/07 season, with the Men's team entering the newly formed Division 4 (North), starting with a 10–4 record in their first year, which was enough to earn them a quick promotion to Division 3.  Two years later, the Giants' Men's team repeated their success, taking second place in the D3 North bracket with a 17–5 win–loss record to earn promotion to Division 2. By comparison, the Women's team entered directly into Division 2 (North) on their debut in 2006, with their second place in the 2008–09 season the highlight so far.

Season-by-season records

References

Basketball teams in England
Sport in Mansfield
Basketball teams established in 1990
1990 establishments in England